Sambo competitions at the 2015 European Games in Baku were held on 22 June 2015 at the Heydar Aliyev Arena, consisting of eight events, four in each gender.

Qualification

Qualification places for Sambo was determined based on qualification event rankings, host NOC allocation and universality by European Sambo Federation.

Medal summary

Men's events

Women's events

Medal table

Participating countries 
The number beside each nation represents the number of athletes who will compete for each country at the 2015 European Games.

References

 
Sports at the 2015 European Games
2015
European Games